Albert Krantz (December 7, 1517), German historian, was a native of Hamburg. He studied law, theology and history at Rostock and Cologne, and after travelling through western and southern Europe was appointed professor, first of philosophy and subsequently of theology, in the University of Rostock, of which he was rector in 1482.

In 1493 he returned to Hamburg as theological lecturer, canon and prebendary in St. Mary's Cathedral. By the Senate of Hamburg he was employed on more than one diplomatic mission abroad, and in 1500 he was chosen by the king of Denmark and the duke of Holstein as arbiter in their dispute regarding the province of Dithmarschen. As dean of the cathedral chapter, to which office he was appointed in 1508, Krantz applied himself with zeal to the reform of ecclesiastical abuses, but, though opposed to various corruptions connected with church discipline, he had little sympathy with the drastic measures of Wycliffe or Huss. With Martin Luther's protest against the abuse of Indulgences he was in general sympathy, but with the reformer's later attitude he could not agree. When, on his death-bed, he heard of the ninety-five theses, he is said, on good authority, to have exclaimed: "Brother, Brother, go into thy cell and say, God have mercy upon me!" Krantz died on December 7, 1517.

Krantz was the author of a number of historical works which for the period when they were written are characterized by exceptional impartiality and research. The principal of these are Chronica regnorum aquilonarium Daniae, Sueciae, et Noruagiae (Strassburg, 1546); Vandalia, sive Historia de Vandalorum vera origine, etc. (Cologne, 1518); Saxonia (1520); and Metropolis, sive Historia de ecclesiis sub Carolo Magno in Saxonia (Basel, 1548). See life by N. Wilckens (Hamburg, 1722).

References

16th-century German historians
1450s births
1517 deaths
Writers from Hamburg
German male non-fiction writers
15th-century German jurists
16th-century German jurists
15th-century German historians